Conliège is a commune in the Jura department in Bourgogne-Franche-Comté in eastern France.

Geography
The Vallière flows north through the commune, in the steephead valley where lies the village.

Population

See also
Communes of the Jura department

References

Communes of Jura (department)